Mwananyamala is an administrative ward in the Kinondoni District of the Dar es Salaam Region of Tanzania. According to the 2002 census, the ward has a total population of 44,531.

References

Kinondoni District
Wards of Dar es Salaam Region